Afro-Costa Ricans are Costa Ricans of African ancestry.

Costa Rica has four small minority groups: Mulattoes, Blacks, Amerindians and Asians (primarily Chinese/East Asian). About eight percent of the population is of African descent or Mulatto (mix of European and African) who are called Afro–Costa Ricans. A large portion of this group descends from the late 19th, and early 20th century waves of Afro-Caribbean migrant workers (mostly from Jamaica). They represent the largest group of Jamaicans living outside of Jamaica's Anglophone dominated diaspora. However, not all Black Costa Ricans are descended from these groups, as some are directly descended from colonial-era enslaved Africans imported to Costa Rica by the Spanish. This latter group, however, is more likely to be mulatto, or tri-racial.

History
The first recorded arrival of people of African descent in Costa Rica came with the Spanish conquistadors. Slave trade was common in all the countries conquered by Spain, and in Costa Rica the first Black people seem to have come from specific sources in Africa- Equatorial and Western regions. The people from these areas were thought of as ideal slaves because they had a reputation for being more robust, affable and hard-working than other Africans.
The enslaved people were from what is now the  Gambia (Mandingas), Guinea (specifically Wolofe), Ghanaian (Ashanti), Benin (specifically Ije / Ararás) and Sudan (Puras). Many of the enslaved people were also Minas (i.e. slaves from parts of the region extending from Ivory Coast to the Slave Coast), Popo (be imported tribes as Ana and Baribas), Yorubas  and Congas (perhaps from Kongasso, Ivory Coast). Slaves also came from other places, such as neighboring Panama.
 
However, the following century witnessed a gradual lessening of the differences between Black people and their white owners. As whites took Black women as their concubines, they freed the children that were born from this union. The same thing started to happen with the "zambos", born of Amerindians and Black people. During the time of slavery, the slaves worked on cattle ranches of Guanacaste and the Central Valley plantations and cacao plantations in Matina, whose situation was more difficult. Over time, many whites freed their slaves and slavery was abolished in 1823, along with the other Central American countries.

The largest Costa Rican Black community is from the Caribbean, which today constitutes the majority of the Costa Rican Black population. Costa Rica has the largest Jamaican diaspora after Cuba and Panama and its development as a nation is witness to this contribution.

Since 1850, fishermen of Afro-Caribbean origin began to settle in the Caribbean coast of Costa Rica, especially from Panama and the West Indies. They stayed in temporary camps during fishing seasons, from March to September, to plant coconuts, cassava, and yams, which were then harvested the following season. Since 1828, some of these fishermen began to settle in Costa Rica permanently with their families.

Towards the second half of the 19th century, coffee became the main export of Costa Rica. The crops were transported from the Pacific Coast, by an inaccessible jungle terrain of the Atlantic Coast. To be taken to Europe, they had to turn back to South America, which increased the cost and removed competitiveness . To remedy this situation, in 1871 a railway and a port on the Atlantic Coast were constructed. Because of the scarcity of local labor, workers were imported from Italy, China, and the Caribbean and Central America. This coincided with an employment crisis in Jamaica that caused an exodus to neighboring countries. So on December 20, 1872, the Lizzie, the first boat from Jamaica, arrived at the port of Limón with 123 workers to work on the railroad. From this moment, the number of Jamaican workers in Limon increased rapidly and the next year already saw over 1,000 Jamaican workers in the port.

Many Jamaicans intended to return home, but most remained in the province of Limón on the Caribbean Coast. In 1890 the railways suffered a financial crisis, forcing many workers to sustain themselves by working in agriculture. This in turn saw the laborers establishing relationships and cultural exchanges with native populations of these areas. Later, the Jamaican workers began working for the banana industry, whose production grew to its peak in 1907.

Usually these workers lived on the plantations and had little knowledge of Costa Rica beyond their immediate environment. The contact was minimal because the Costa Rican banana plantations were in foreign hands. They did not speak Spanish and retained Jamaican customs. They had their own schools with teachers brought from Jamaica. Until 1949 Costa Rica had segregation laws where Black people lived exclusively in the Caribbean Province of Puerto Limón. By 2011 Afro–Costa Ricans were spread in all 7 Costa Rican provinces: 32% of them in San José, 16% in Alajuela, 15% in Limón, 10% in Heredia and 8% in Cartago and Guanacaste. Today, Afro–Costa Rican people are part of different disciplines and fields in Costa Rica.

Demographics
Eight percent of the population is Afro–Costa Rican (black or mulatto), compared to 2.4 percent who are Amerindian and 83 percent who are of European heritage (including castizo and mestizo). In the province of Guanacaste, a significant portion of the population is Afro-mestizo, descended from a mix of local Amerindians, Africans and Spaniards. Until 1949 most Afro–Costa Ricans lived in Limón and were denied Costa Rican citizenship and thus the right to vote.

Notable Afro-Costa Ricans
Politics
Epsy Campbell Barr, Vice President

https://en.m.wikipedia.org/wiki/Epsy_Campbell_Barr

Sports
Jake Beckford, footballer
Try Bennett, footballer
Jewison Bennette, footballer
Kurt Bernard, footballer
Felicio Brown Forbes, footballer
Keyner Brown, footballer
Steven Bryce, footballer
Berny Burke, footballer
Joel Campbell, footballer
Kenny Cunningham, footballer
Errol Daniels, footballer
Rudy Dawson, footballer
Jervis Drummond, footballer
Neighel Drummond, footballer
Jordy Evans, footballer
Waylon Francis, footballer
Julio Fuller, footballer
Keysher Fuller, footballer
Mayron George, footballer
Álvaro Grant, footballer
Donny Grant, footballer
Floyd Guthrie, footballer
Jaylon Hadden, footballer
Denis Hamlett, footballer
Carlos Johnson, footballer
Derrick Johnson, footballer
Rodrigo Kenton, footballer
Ariel Lassiter, footballer
Ian Lawrence, footballer
Jedwin Lester, footballer
Dexter Lewis, footballer
Leroy Lewis, footballer
Dennis Marshall, footballer
Jonathan McDonald, footballer
Hernán Medford, footballer
Jaikel Medina, footballer
Roy Miller, footballer
Rodolfo Mills, footballer
Josué Mitchell, footballer
Kraesher Mooke, footballer
Lester Morgan, footballer
Bernard Mullins, footballer
Roy Myers, footballer
David Myrie, footballer
Roy Myrie, footballer
Edder Nelson, footballer
Jhamir Ordain, footballer
Reynaldo Parks, footballer
Winston Parks, footballer
Fernando Patterson, footballer
Patrick Pemberton, footballer
Saúl Phillips, footballer
Allard Plummer, footballer
Alexander Robinson, footballer
Manfred Russell, footballer
Erick Scott, footballer
Jean Scott, footballer
Miguel Simpson, footballer
Orlando Sinclair, footballer
Jordan Smith, footballer
Richard Smith, footballer
Roy Smith, footballer
William Sunsing, footballer
Carlos Toppings, footballer
Harold Wallace, footballer
Rodney Wallace, footballer
Javier Wanchope, footballer
Paulo Wanchope, footballer
Vicente Wanchope, footballer
Kendall Waston, footballer
Carlos Watson, footballer
Jorge White, footballer
Roan Wilson, footballer
Whayne Wilson, footballer
Johnny Woodly, footballer
Berny Wright, footballer
Mauricio Wright, footballer

References

 
Costa Rican
Ethnic groups in Costa Rica
Jamaican diaspora